Petrochromis is a genus of cichlids endemic to Lake Tanganyika in east Africa.

Species
There are currently 8 recognized species are in this genus:
 Petrochromis ephiphium Brichard, 1989
 Petrochromis famula Matthes & Trewavas, 1960
 Petrochromis fasciolatus Boulenger, 1914
 Petrochromis horii Takahashi & Koblmüller, 2014
 Petrochromis macrognathus Yamaoka, 1983
 Petrochromis orthognathus Matthes, 1959
 Petrochromis polyodon Boulenger, 1898
 Petrochromis trewavasae Poll, 1948 (Thread-fin cichlid)

References

 
Tropheini
Fish of Africa
Cichlid genera
Taxa named by George Albert Boulenger